Roger North, 2nd Baron North (1530 – 3 December 1600) was an English peer and politician at the court of Elizabeth I.

He was the son of Edward North, 1st Baron North, for whom the title Baron North had been created. After representing Cambridgeshire in several parliaments (1555, 1559 and 1563), North acceded to his title in 1564. He may have succeeded his father as Lord Lieutenant of Cambridgeshire as well, and was Custos Rotulorum of Cambridgeshire before 1573. He was appointed Treasurer of the Household in 1596 after the death of Sir Francis Knollys.

North played card games called "maw" and Primero with Elizabeth on 6 August 1576. The queen came to his house at Kirtling for three days on 1 September 1578. The visit cost Lord North £642. He gave the queen a jewel worth £120.

North was a personal friend of Robert Dudley, Earl of Leicester, the Queen's favourite. He was present at the latter's secret marriage to Lettice Knollys, Countess of Essex in 1578, and served at his expedition to the Netherlands in 1585–1587. Leicester wanted to make Lord North governor of Brill in 1586, which desire was, however, declined by Elizabeth.

North was succeeded upon his death in 1600 by his grandson, Dudley North, 3rd Baron North, the son of Sir John North.

References

Bruce, John (ed.) (1844): Correspondence of Robert Dudley, Earl of Leycester, during his Government of the Low Countries, in the Years 1585 and 1586 Camden Society 

1530 births
1600 deaths
Lord-Lieutenants of Cambridgeshire
Treasurers of the Household
Roger
English MPs 1555
English MPs 1559
English MPs 1563–1567
16th-century English nobility
Barons North